Luke Lawrence is a Grand Prix motorcycle racer from the United Kingdom.

At the opening round of the 2006 National MRO 250cc Grand Prix championship at Brands Hatch Luke, who was based in Sudbury, Suffolk at the time, qualified on pole position, won 3 races and set the fastest lap time. Following the opening round of New Era Superclub championship at Snetterton Luke also led those championship standings (with a victory in the wet starting from pit lane) Luke went on to score points in the opening European Championship 250cc Grand Prix races and was then ceded for a Wildcard at the 2006 British Grand Prix at Donington Park.

Lawrence has ridden in a total of five Grand Prix events, three in the 2006 Grand Prix motorcycle racing season (Donington, Brno and Estoril) and a further two wildcards at Grands Prix in 2007 - The British Grand Prix (Donington Park) on board the C&L Racing Honda (Entered as TNT Express Team FILA) and the Portuguese Grand Prix (Estoril) on board the Team MAS Aprilia (Entered by employer and sponsor Team McDonald's)

In 2007 Lawrence paid to ride an Aprilia with Team MAS in the European 250cc Grand Prix Championship. He had a late start to the season after signing over the winter to ride for Winona WCM, who have been unable to race this season following the withdrawal of the team's principal sponsor. Lawrence rode for C&L Racing at two events before signing to ride with Team MAS under the support of McDonald's Corporation and the 'Not bad for a McJob' campaign.

Lawrence was unable to continue with Team MAS in 2008 due to a lack of funding, but was offered a ride on a Kawasaki ZX10 in the CEV Spanish Superbike Championship (Formula Extreme) but due to funding problems unfortunately had to withdraw from the series midway through the season.

Luke returned to race in the UK for 2009 in the one make Triumph Triple Challenge with two class podiums and also entered several rounds of the Toyota Sprint Series - a UK-based Toyota only car sprint championship taking 3rd in Class at his initial outing at Rockingham.

Career statistics

By season

Races by year

References

External links
 Luke Lawrence Official Website
 http://www.motogp.com/en/riders/Luke+Lawrence

People from Sudbury, Suffolk
British motorcycle racers
250cc World Championship riders
Living people
1979 births